Rob Hill (born 11 June 1967) is a British former field hockey player who competed in the 1992 Summer Olympics.

He now plays for Mighty 4s at Eastbourne Hockey club (he won the most improved player in 2017) and also works at Eastbourne College as Director of Hockey. He is currently house master of Wargrave House. He used to teach at Sherborne School.

References

External links
 

1967 births
Living people
British male field hockey players
Olympic field hockey players of Great Britain
Field hockey players at the 1992 Summer Olympics
1990 Men's Hockey World Cup players